Wolfgang Streeck (born 27 October 1946) is a German economic sociologist and emeritus director of the Max Planck Institute for the Study of Societies in Cologne.

Early life
Streeck was born "just outside Münster", the son of refugees – ethnic Germans from eastern Europe displaced by the end of the Second World War. His mother was a Sudeten German from Czechoslovakia.

Streeck studied sociology at the Goethe University Frankfurt and pursued graduate studies in the same discipline at Columbia University between 1972 and 1974.

Career
In 1974 he became assistant professor in sociology at the University of Münster and in 1986 finished his habilitation in sociology at Bielefeld University. Between 1988 and 1995 he worked as professor of sociology and industrial relations at the University of Wisconsin–Madison, returning to Germany in 1995 to take up the post of director of the Max Planck Institute for the Study of Societies and working as professor of sociology at the University of Cologne. He retired from his directorship in 2014, becoming emeritus director.

Work
Streeck's research is focused on analyzing the political economy of capitalism, wherein he proposes to take on a dialectical approach to institutional analysis as opposed to the more rigid varieties of capitalism. He has written extensively on the political economy of Germany and more recently has involved himself in debates over the politics of austerity, the rise of what he terms the debt-state as a result of the neoliberal revolution of the 1980s and the future of the European Union. Besides numerous articles published in various European journals, he has authored scores of books, some of them available in translations.

End of capitalism
In 2014, Streeck wrote an article in the New Left Review where he postulates how capitalism might come to an end, discussing several factors that make this likely to happen. Streeck posits that because contemporary capitalism is beset by five disorders—declining growth, oligarchy, starvation of the public sphere, corruption and international anarchy—for which at present no political agency exists to confront them, it will continue to regress and atrophy until at some point it might end. He expanded on this theme in a 2016 book How Will Capitalism End?

Personal life
Streeck and his wife live in part of the farmyard of a castle in Brühl, a small town close to Cologne.

Books

 Critical Encounters. Capitalism, Democracy, Ideas. Verso Books, London 2020, ISBN 978-1-78873-874-3.
 How Will Capitalism End?: Essays on a Failing System. Verso Books, Brooklyn 2016, ISBN 978-1-78478-401-0.
 Buying Time: The Delayed Crisis of Democratic Capitalism.  Verso Books, London 2014, ISBN 978-1-78168-548-8.
 Re-Forming Capitalism: Institutional Change in the German Political Economy. Oxford University Press, Oxford 2009.
 Governing interests: business associations facing internationalization. Routledge, 2006, ISBN 0-415-36486-8.
 with Ruth Dukes: Democracy at Work: Contract, Status and Post-Industrial Justice, Cambridge: Polity 2022.
 with Colin Crouch: The diversity of democracy: corporatism, social order and political conflict. Edward Elgar Publishing, 2006, ISBN 1-84542-613-4.
 with Kathleen Ann Thelen: Beyond continuity: institutional change in advanced political economies. Oxford University Press, 2005, ISBN 0-19-928046-0.
 with Kôzô Yamamura: The origins of nonliberal capitalism: Germany and Japan in comparison. Cornell University Press, 2001, ISBN 0-8014-3917-5.
 with Colin Crouch: Political economy of modern capitalism: mapping convergence and diversity. SAGE, 1997, ISBN 0-7619-5653-0.

References

External links
 Max-Planck Institute Prof. Dr. Dr. h.c. Wolfgang Streeck
 Wolfgang Streeck's blog

1946 births
Living people
People from Lengerich, Westphalia
German sociologists
Macroeconomists
Economic sociologists
Aufstehen
Max Planck Society people
Goethe University Frankfurt alumni
Columbia University alumni
Academic staff of the University of Cologne
University of Wisconsin–Madison faculty
Corresponding Fellows of the British Academy
Max Planck Institute directors